Diary of a Mad Dog is the debut solo album by Cypress Hill rapper Sen Dog. It was released September 30, 2008 via indie label Suburban Noize Records. The record features guest appearances by the likes of Kottonmouth Kings, Demrick, B-Real, Mellow Man Ace, Slip Matola, and J-Killa among others.

Production
According to the rapper, it is his most personal music creation to date. The albums touches various topics including his gang affiliations in his early life, and a mild heart attack, which he suffered during the making of the album. 
"I've done the whole dark, morbid thing and the whole rock-n-roll crossover thing. I'm not going to have an agenda on this; I’m going to jam and record whatever is fun to me. With Cypress Hill I'm working with B-Real and DJ Muggs, but with my solo material, it's a bit more of a challenge and more rewarding for me as a songwriter when I come up with tracks and they sound banging."

Track listing

Personnel
Brad Xavier – executive producer
Casey Quintal – art direction, design
Devin DeHaven – photography
Henry Bagramyan – photography
John E. Necro – producer, mixing
Kevin Zinger – executive producer
Patrick "P-Nice" Shevelin – producer, mastering, mixing

References

External links

Sen Dog albums
2008 debut albums
Albums produced by DJ Khalil
Suburban Noize Records albums